Omission bias is the phenomenon in which people prefer omission (inaction) over commission (action) and people tend to judge harm as a result of commission more negatively than harm as a result of omission.   It can occur due to a number of processes, including psychological inertia, the perception of transaction costs, and the perception that commissions are more casual than omissions. In social political terms the Universal Declaration of Human Rights establishes how basic human rights are to be assessed in article 2, as "without distinction of any kind, such as race, colour, sex, language, religion, political or other opinion, national or social origin, property, birth or other status." criteria that are often subject to one or another form of omission bias.   It is controversial as to whether omission bias is a cognitive bias or is often rational. The bias is often showcased through the trolley problem and has also been described as an explanation for the endowment effect and status quo bias.

Examples and applications

Spranca, Minsk and Baron extended the omission bias to judgments of morality of choices. In one scenario, John, a tennis player, would be facing a tough opponent the next day in a decisive match. John knows his opponent is allergic to a food substance. Subjects were presented with two conditions: John recommends the food containing the allergen to hurt his opponent's performance, or the opponent himself orders the allergenic food, and John says nothing. A majority of people judged that John's action of recommending the allergenic food as being more immoral than John's inaction of not informing the opponent of the allergenic substance.

The effect has also held in real world athletic arenas: NBA statistics showcased referees called 50 percent fewer fouls in the final moments of close games.

An additional real-world example is when parents decide not to vaccinate their children because of the potential chance of death—even when the probability the vaccination will cause death is much less likely than death from the disease prevented.

See also
 List of cognitive biases
 Psychological inertia
 Lying by omission
 Omission
 Sin of omission
 Status quo bias
 Endowment effect
 Trolley problem
 "All that is necessary for the triumph of evil is for good men to do nothing" for contrast

References

Bibliography
 
 

Cognitive biases
Barriers to critical thinking
Cognitive inertia
Deception
Error
Law of negligence
Moral psychology